Andrew Buckland is an American film editor. son of immigrant British parents, and married to his Argentinian wife.  He won an Academy Award in the category Best Film Editing for the film Ford v Ferrari (2019). 

Andrew Buckland has been working in film after graduating from Purchase College with a degree in Film Production, Andrew gained most of his experience working in the editorial department on many high profile films such as Crouching Tiger Hidden Dragon, Angels In America, and Charlie Wilson’s War. Andrew’s first documentary The Long Wall Home portrays his father’s journey of rediscovering his roots while walking 80 miles along Hadrian’s Wall in northern England. Somos Wichi, Andrew’s second film, expands on the theme of roots. The film portrays an indigenous people known as Wichi who are struggling to cope with their changing environment. In the film we discover a people whose cultural character compels them to avoid direct conflict and instead look for balance. Andrew currently lives in Los Angeles. www.somoswichi.com

Selected filmography 
 Get on Up 2014  https://www.imdb.com/name/nm0118202/?ref_=nv_sr_srsg_0 
 Somos Wichi -  2011 filmmaker 
 The Girl on the Train (2016; co-edited with Michael McCusker)
 Ford v Ferrari (2019; co-won the Academy Award for Best Film Editing with McCusker and Bafta )

References

External links 
 

Living people
Place of birth missing (living people)
Year of birth missing (living people)
American film editors
Best Film Editing Academy Award winners
Best Editing BAFTA Award winners